Michael Coulthart is a Canadian microbiologist and sometime pathologist who is employed as the head of the Canadian Creutzfeldt–Jakob Disease Surveillance System (CJDSS) within the Public Health Agency of Canada (PHAC), which terms CJD a zoonotic and infectious disease. In 2006, a working group named "classic CJD" as well as Variant Creutzfeldt–Jakob disease as two notifiable diseases. It is unknown whether PHAC tracks in an official capacity other transmissible spongiform encephalopathies (TSE), but Coulthart is on the Advisory Committee of the Center for Infectious Disease Research and Policy for Chronic Wasting Disease of cervidae.

Early life
Little is known of Coulthart's early life.

Career
In 1983, Coulthart worked at McMaster University. He appears to have been affiliated with the University of Quebec around the turn of the millennium while he was researching influenza B viruses. In 2002, he co-authored a study on human pathogenic Vibrio species (a genus of Gram-negative bacteria that cause foodborne infection, usually associated with eating undercooked seafood) on which the first author was at the University of British Columbia.

In 2001, Coulthart teamed up with Neil Cashman to write a paper on "Variant Creutzfeldt-Jakob disease: A summary of current scientific knowledge in relation to public health".

As early as December 2003, Coulthart worked at the National Microbiology Laboratory (NML) in Winnipeg, where he reported that "In May 2003, Canada became the 22nd country outside of the United Kingdom to report a case of bovine spongiform encephalopathy (BSE) in an animal not known to be imported from a country with cattle previously affected by this fatal, transmissible prion disease."

In November 2004, Coulthart was co-author of a study on scrapie of mice. At the time he worked in the Division of Host Genetics and Prion Diseases of the NML.

In 2006, Coulthart participated in research on Cellular prion protein in human platelets.

In 2007, Coulthart participated in research on chronic wasting disease, the term for TSE in deer, elk, and moose, along with collaborator Cashman.

In 2011, Coulthart, Cashman et al studied "the value of cerebrospinal fluid (CSF) proteins as diagnostic markers in a clinical population of subacute encephalopathy patients with relatively low prevalence of sporadic Creutzfeldt-Jakob disease (sCJD)."

In 2013, Coulthart Cashman et al described at an academic conference Creutzfeldt-Jakob disease reporting in Canada.

In 2014, Coulthart et al studied the RT-QuIC assay, which is "able to detect low levels of the disease-inducing isoform of the prion protein (PrP(d)) in brain tissue biopsies and (CSF)," and "has great potential to become a method for diagnosing prion disease ante mortem."

In 2019, Coulthart was concerned with a girl from Ontario who died of sCJD "with initially rapid neurocognitive decline followed by a prolonged (∼10 years) clinical course. Neuropathological findings at autopsy included generalized cerebral and cerebellar atrophy with relative sparing of the hippocampi, cerebral and cerebellar white matter and gray matter involvement, minimal spongiform change, PrP deposits in the neocortex, striatum and cerebellum by immunohistochemistry, and protease-resistant PrP by Western immunoblot. With its longer disease duration and atypical manifestations of white matter loss, CJD-LS can be clinically mistaken for other neurodegenerative diseases, or in the pediatric setting for metabolic or genetic conditions. This case clearly demonstrates that with rapid-onset encephalopathy, prion disease should be carefully considered, even in younger patients with slower disease progression."

In June 2019, Coulthart was the lead interviewee who was called to answer the question: "Why did deer meat from an infected herd end up in Canada's food chain?" when "scientists, indigenous leaders and wildlife advocates signed a letter to Prime Minister Justin Trudeau urging immediate action to stop the spread" of CWD in Canada, and "to recognize the dire nature of this epidemic." Amongst the signatories of this letter was Coulthart's colleague Cashman. The catalyst was the plague of CWD that was discovered on or around certain deer farms in southern Quebec. Coulthart had on 15 March 2019 made a presentation to the Ontario Federation of Anglers and Hunters (who are an intimately concerned party because they eat the meat from the deer which they kill) about the problem of CWD.

Coulthart was the federal lead on the 2021 investigation into the New Brunswick neurological syndrome of unknown cause (NSUC) cluster, which was first identified in 2019. The existence of the disease cluster was published in a provincial government memo which was leaked to the Radio-Canada through a whistleblower. By 26 March 2021, Coulthart as CJDSS director, had ruled out "a prion disease such as Creutzfeldt-Jakob disease (CJD)" even though there were many similarities. At that time, early on in their research, a "top priority" was to investigate possible exposure to toxins.

References

Canadian microbiologists
Canadian public health doctors
Living people
Canadian health officials
Year of birth missing (living people)